The Longwood Lancers softball team is the college softball team which represents Longwood University in Farmville, Virginia. The school's team currently competes in the Big South Conference, having done so since the 2013 season. They have been led since 2020 by Megan Brown.

History

The softball team was first fielded in 1981. They were members of Division II through the 2004 season, when they (along with other Longwood Lancers teams) began a transition to Division I. They previously competed in the Division II Carolinas–Virginia Athletic Conference from 1996 through 2003; in their final two seasons in CVAC, they won the tournament championship, as well as the 2003 regular season championship, and competed in the NCAA Division II Softball Championship each year.

In their first season of membership in the Big South Conference, Longwood won the tournament championship. Two years later, they repeated the feat, in addition winning their first Big South regular season championship, and their first NCAA Division I Softball Championship victory, beating Virginia Tech. The following year, they again repeated as regular season and tournament champions; in the 2016 NCAA Tournament, the Lancers advanced to the regional finals, where they fell to James Madison.

Postseason

NCAA Division I tournament results
The Lancers have appeared in the NCAA Division I softball tournament four times. Their record is 5–10.

NCAA Division II tournament results
The Lancers appeared in the NCAA Division II Softball Championship twice, in 2002 and 2003. Their record is 2–4.

Coaches

Year-by-year results

References